Salazie is a volcanic caldera and commune (administrative division) in the department and region of Réunion.

The first settlement of the area took place in 1829 after a cyclone had devastated the nearby coast, and the municipality of Salazie was formed in 1889. The name of the commune is potentially derived from the Malagasy word , meaning 'good encampment'.

Geography
Salazie lies in the middle of island, north-east of Piton des Neiges (the highest point on the island), in the Cirque de Salazie (actually a volcanic caldera). The commune is totally landlocked, and borders the communes of Bras-Panon, Cilaos, La Possession, Saint-André, Saint-Benoît, Saint-Denis, Sainte-Marie and Sainte-Suzanne.

Climate

Salazie has a subtropical highland climate (Köppen climate classification Cfb).

Population

Personalities
Anchaing and Héva: reality or legend of a couple of runaway slaves

Gallery

See also
Hell-Bourg, a village, part of the commune of Salazie
Trou de Fer
Communes of the Réunion department
Bridal Veil Falls

References

External links
CIREST site
Official site of the commune

Communes of Réunion
Calderas of Réunion